Sikhotealinia is a genus of beetle containing a single species, Sikhotealinia zhiltzovae, which is the only living representative of the family Jurodidae. It was discovered in the Sikhote-Alin mountains in Outer Manchuria. This "living fossil" is unique in having three ocelli on their forehead, a condition otherwise unknown in the entire order Coleoptera, whether extinct or living - though it is common in other orders, and generally considered a groundplan character for neopteran insects. Sikhotealinia and its extinct relative Jurodes are considered as a sister group to all other archostematan beetles.

References

Further reading

External links
 Illustration
 Most mysterious representative of beetles - Sikhotealinia zhiltzovae Lafer, 1996 Photos

Archostemata
Monotypic Archostemata genera